Scottish Orienteering Association (SOA), also known as Scottish Orienteering, is the association for Orienteering in Scotland and is a constituent association of the British Orienteering Federation. It is the [[Scottish Governing Body for the sport of Orienteering in Scotland.

Governance and organisation
The SOA's governing body is composed of President Richard Oxlade and directors in seven areas. The seven areas are Development, Marketing & Communications, Operations, Performance, Partnerships, Secretary and Treasurer. All members of the governing body are volunteers. The volunteers are supported by salaried staff in the roles of Chief Operating Officer, Events Manager, Coaching & Volunteering Officer, an Admin Assistant and three Part-Time Regional Development Officers. Due to the high volunteer to paid staff ratio, much of the work such is undertaken by volunteers.

The Associations membership is roughly 1,400 who act as volunteers, organising and staging events. Of the members many also coach and are members of SOA affiliated local clubs of which there are 18 local and 4 university.

Membership
The Associations membership is roughly 1,400.

Affiliated Scottish Clubs

Local clubs
These clubs are the Scottish clubs listed on the SOA's website.

University clubs

Scottish Schools Orienteering Association

There is a Scottish Schools Orienteering Association which is abbreviated to SSOA. The SSOA's main aims are to encourage schools to introduce orienteering to either the formal or informal curriculum and to organise an annual festival where these skills can be tested. This annual event, which took place on a Sunday, was until 1994 the Scottish Schools Orienteering Championships. The Annual Schools' Festival now runs on the first Friday of June and is called Scottish Schools Orienteering Festival(SSOF).In 2008 the SSOA held the World Schools' Championships  in Edinburgh. The 2017 SSOF was held at Drumpellier Country Park, Coatbridge on Friday June 2.

The Organisation also has four major partners, Scottish Schools Sport Federation, International School Sport Federation, SOA and British Schools Orienteering Association.

References

External links
 Scottish Orienteering

Orienteering
British Orienteering Federation
Orienteering in Scotland